Rožkalni Parish is an administrative unit of Preiļi Municipality in the Latgale region of Latvia.

References 

Parishes of Latvia
Preiļi Municipality
Latgale